Under mitt tak is the second studio album by Swedish singer-songwriter Sonja Aldén, released in 2008.

Track listing
 Under mitt tak (lyrics: Sonja Aldén, music: Sonja Aldén, Bobby Ljunggren and Henrik Wikström)
 Jag vet att du kan höra mig (lyrics: Sonja Aldén, music: Marcos Ubeda and Bobby Ljunggren)
 En del är vackra när de dör (lyrics: Sonja Aldén, music: Sonja Aldén, Bobby Ljunggren and Henrik Wikström)
 Allt jag ser (lyrics: Sonja Aldén, music: Sonja Aldén, Bobby Ljunggren and Henrik Wikström)
 Nån som du (lyrics: Sonja Aldén, music: Sonja Aldén, Bobby Ljunggren and Henrik Wikström)
 Du är en del av mig (lyrics: Uno Svenningsson, music: Uno Svenningsson and Bobby Ljunggren)
 Starkare än då (lyrics: Sonja Aldén, music: Amir Aly, Maciel Numhauser, and Robin Abrahamsson)
 Din klocka tickar (lyrics: Sonja Aldén, music: Sonja Aldén, Bobby Ljunggren and Henrik Wikström)
 Det blå (lyrics: Sonja Aldén, music: Sonja Aldén and Hugo Björk)
 Lyckan kommer, lyckan går (lyrics : Sonja Aldén, music: Sonja Aldén, Bobby Ljunggren and Henrik Wikström)
 Du får inte (lyrics and music: Sonja Aldén)
 Välkommen hem (lyrics and music: Sonja Aldén)

Contributors
Sonja Aldén - vocals
Jörgen Ingeström - guitar, drums, keyboard, producer
Robert Ivansson - bass
Bo Reime - percussion, producer

Charts

Weekly charts

Year-end charts

References 

2008 albums
Sonja Aldén albums
Swedish-language albums